Vibal may refer to

Vibal, trade name for cyanocobalamin
Gaspar Vibal, Filipino businessman
Le Vibal, French commune
Vibal Publishing House, a publishing house in the Philippines